Prior to the closure of parent company ProElite on October 20, 2008, EliteXC: A Night of Champions was to be a mixed martial arts event held by EliteXC that would have taken place on November 8, 2008 in Reno, Nevada at the Reno Events Center. The event was scheduled to include two title fights and would have aired on the Showtime cable network.

Background
The main event was set to feature the then EliteXC middleweight champion Robbie Lawler as he defended his belt against former King of the Cage middleweight champion Joey Villasenor.  This fight was going to be a rematch from PRIDE 32 in which Lawler won by KO.

The second scheduled title fight featured top-ranked fighter Eddie Alvarez vs. contender Nick Diaz for the then-vacant EliteXC lightweight title.  This title had been stripped from former champion K. J. Noons for failing to defend.

Also on the card was to be the return of former WEC light heavyweight champion Scott Smith vs. Cage Fighting Championship (CFC) middleweight champion Hector Lombard.

It was reported by MMA Junkie that Cyrille Diabate was offered a fight with Rafael Cavalcante for the vacant Light Heavyweight belt, but declined stating he did not have enough time to prepare.

Announced matchups

Main card

See also 
 Elite Xtreme Combat
 2008 in Elite Xtreme Combat

References

External links
Official EliteXC Site
EliteXC: Events List

Defunct sporting events
A Night of Champions
2008 in mixed martial arts
Mixed martial arts in Nevada
Sports in Reno, Nevada
2008 in sports in Nevada